Orthoclydon praefectata, the flax looper moth or flax window maker, is a moth of the family Geometridae. It is endemic to New Zealand.

Description 
The wing span of this species is 38–45 mm.  The male moth is a pale brown and the female a glossy white.

Taxonomy 
O. praefectata was first described by Francis Walker under the name Acidalia praefectata. George Hudson discussed and illustrated this species in 1898 under the name Xanthorhoe praefectata.

Distribution and habitat 
This moth is endemic to and is widely distributed throughout New Zealand.

The habitat/food plant for this moth is the New Zealand native flax Phormium tenax.

Life cycle

Eggs 
Eggs are straw coloured and are laid on the underside of the flax leaf.

Larva 
The caterpillar is a brown/green colour . It has three dark red lines on its back and a yellow line on each flank. When fully grown it is approximately 2.5 cm long.

Adult 
Adult moths are seen in all the summer months.

See also
Butterflies of New Zealand

References

External links
https://web.archive.org/web/20081018023812/http://ento.org.nz/nzentomologist/free_issues/Weta20_1_1997/Weta20%281%29_17_20.pdf
http://www.landcareresearch.co.nz/resources/identification/animals/bug-id/alphabetic-list-of-bugs/flax-looper-damage

Moths of New Zealand
Moths described in 1861
Cidariini
Endemic fauna of New Zealand
Taxa named by Francis Walker (entomologist)
Endemic moths of New Zealand